Fermín Emilio Sosa Rodríguez (born 12 April 1968) is a Mexican archbishop of the Catholic Church who was appointed apostolic nuncio to Papua New Guinea and named an archbishop in March 2021.

Biography
Fermín Emilio Sosa Rodríguez was born in Izamal, Mexico, on 12 April 1968 to José Alfonso Sosa López y Norma Rodríguez Sánchez. He entered the seminary of the Archdiocese of Yucatán in Mérida in 1991 and was ordained a deacon on 29 April 1998. He was ordained a priest of the archdiocese of Yucatán on 12 July 1998 by Cardinal Darío Castrillón Hoyos in the cathedral of Guadalupe. In October of that year he entered the Pontifical Ecclesiastical Academy to prepare for a career in the diplomatic service. He earned a doctorate in canon law at the Pontifical Gregorian University on 20 November 2002.

He entered the diplomatic service of the Holy See on 1 January 2003. His assignments included postings in the papal representations in Papua New Guinea, Côte d'Ivoire, Burkina Faso, the United States of America, Canada, and Serbia.

On 31 March 2021, Pope Francis appointed him titular archbishop of Virunum and apostolic nuncio to Papua New Guinea. His consecration as bishop took place in Izamal on 19 June with Cardinal Pietro Parolin as consecrator.

On 16 December 2021, he was given additional responsibility as Apostolic Nuncio to the Solomon Islands.

See also
 List of heads of the diplomatic missions of the Holy See

References

External links
  

1968 births
Living people
People from Yucatán
Mexican Roman Catholic priests
Pontifical Gregorian University alumni
Pontifical Ecclesiastical Academy alumni
Apostolic Nuncios to Papua New Guinea
Apostolic Nuncios to the Solomon Islands